Raúl Cervantes Andrade (born 3 June 1963) is a Mexican lawyer, academic, businessman and politician. He was CEO of CEA Abogados S.C., Vice-president of the National Chamber of Passage and Tourism Transportation and has been a Federal Deputy twice for PRI. He served as Senator of the LXII Legislature of the Mexican Congress from September 1, 2013 until August 30, 2014.

He graduated from Universidad Iberoamericana Ciudad de México and earned a Law in Ph.D. with honorific mention and cum laude from Panamerican University and several other courses and certifications in protection, economic and corporate law, international trade and finance law, criminal law, banking law and senior management. He was elected Federal Deputy in the LVIII Legislature of the Mexican Congress from 2000 to 2003 and in the LX Legislature from 2006 to 2009.

He is founder and was CEO of a law firm named CEA Lawyers. The firm has specialised in transportation law and quickly became one of the main references in the transportation industry in Mexico.

He was elected Senator by the National Party List from 2012 to 2018. He presided the Constitutional Points Committee of the Senate. September 1, 2013 he assumed the presidency of the Senate board, charge that concluded August 31, 2014. September 3, 2014 he asked for license to separate himself indefinitely from his charge. Now, he is a full-time professor at ITAM, lecturer and writer.

References

1963 births
Living people
Institutional Revolutionary Party politicians
Members of the Senate of the Republic (Mexico)
Presidents of the Senate of the Republic (Mexico)
21st-century Mexican politicians
Members of the Constituent Assembly of Mexico City
Attorneys general of Mexico